The Tune is a 1992 independent animated musical-comedy film directed by Bill Plympton.

Plot summary
Del, a hard-working songwriter, is trying to write the perfect song for his slimeball boss, Mr. Mega, so he can keep his job and his girlfriend, Didi. As he rushes to work, he gets lost in a cloverleaf highway and ends up lost in a town called Flooby Nooby, where he meets the town's singing and swingin' mayor, an Elvis-impersonating dog, a noseless cab driver, and a psychotic bellhop as he tries to get to Mr. Mega's office to deliver the song.

Production
The Tune,  was Bill Plympton's first feature-length film and incorporates earlier shorts released by Plympton, including The Wiseman (1991), Dig My Do (1990), and Tango Schmango (1990). It was self-funded and took two years to make. Its music was composed by Maureen McElheron, a longtime friend of Plympton's who has composed the music for most of his films.

Reception
The Tune premiered April 25, 1992 at the Sundance Film Festival. It was also shown at the Cannes Film Festival before being released in the United States on September 4, 1992. At least one critic observed that the incorporated shorts seemed out-of-place with the film's original material.  The Tune was nominated for a number of awards in 1992 and 1993. The film was preserved by the Academy Film Archive in 2016.

See also
The Point!
List of animated feature films

References

External links

1992 films
American musical comedy films
Films directed by Bill Plympton
American animated feature films
1990s American animated films
1990s musical comedy films
1992 comedy films
1990s English-language films
American independent films